Nari is a Bollywood film. It was released in 1942 starring Trilok Kapoor and Lalita Pawar. The music director was Harishchandra Bali.

References

External links
 

1942 films
1940s Hindi-language films
Indian black-and-white films